Rocky Creek Bridge may refer to:

 Rocky Creek Bridge (Oregon), arch bridge (1927)
 Rocky Creek Bridge (California), arch bridge (1932)